The National Collegiate Boxing Association (NCBA) is a non-profit college sports organization that organizes boxing fights for student athletes. The association falls under the auspices of USA Boxing. After 1960, the NCAA no longer sanctioned boxing. In response, the NCBA was founded in 1976.

NCBA member schools are encouraged to develop their instructional and intramural programs with emphasis on the teaching of fundamental novice boxing skills. In order to be eligible to participate in an NCBA member school, a collegiate boxer must be a full-time student at an accredited institution at which he/she is attending for graduation.

Participating schools
Participating schools are divided into three sub-associations, by region:

Eastern Collegiate Boxing Association
Norwich University
Kutztown University
Lock Haven University
Pennsylvania State University
Pennsylvania State University - Harrisburg
Shippensburg University
United States Military Academy (Army)
University of Massachusetts - Amherst
University of Connecticut
Trinity College, Hartford, CT
Salisbury University
University of Hartford 
Hartford, CT

Formerly
United States Coast Guard Academy (boxing team disbanded in 2018)

Midwest Collegiate Boxing Association
Iowa State University
Miami University (Ohio)
Ohio State University
United States Naval Academy (Navy)
University of Cincinnati
University of Kansas
University of North Carolina at Chapel Hill
West Virginia University
Xavier University
University of Iowa

Far West Collegiate Boxing Association
 Boise State University
 California State University, Northridge
San José State University
Santa Clara University
United States Air Force Academy (Air Force)
University of California, Berkeley
University of California, Irvine
University of California, Davis
University of California, Los Angeles
University of San Francisco
University of Southern California
University of Nevada, Reno
University of Nevada, Las Vegas
University of Washington
University of Oregon
Oregon State University

Weight classes

National tournament
Contestants for the national tournament are decided by a regional tournament for each NCBA region, with the first- and second-place boxer from each weight class in each region advancing to the national tournament. It is possible for a boxer to advance to nationals by walkover if they have no opponent.

At nationals, the team scoring is conducted as follows:
 Each team automatically receives 1 point.
 Each boxer who wins a quarterfinal match earns 1 point for their team.
 Each boxer who wins a semi-final match earns 3 points for their team.
 Each boxer who wins a final match earns 5 points for their team.

National team champions

See also
College club sports in the United States
Collegiate Nationals
NCAA Boxxing Championship

References

External links
 

Amateur boxing organizations
College boxing in the United States
College sports governing bodies in the United States